Willie Creek is an American former Negro league catcher who played in the 1920s and 1930s.

Creek made his Negro leagues debut in 1924 with the Washington Potomacs. He went on to play 
for the Brooklyn Royal Giants from 1929 to 1931, spent 1932 with the Bacharach Giants, and finished his career in 1933 back with Brooklyn.

References

External links
 and Baseball-Reference Black Baseball stats and Seamheads

Year of birth missing
Place of birth missing
Bacharach Giants players
Brooklyn Royal Giants players
Washington Potomacs players
Baseball catchers